The Interior of an Atelier of a Woman Painter is a 1789 painting by Marie-Victoire Lemoine. It is in the collection of the Metropolitan Museum of Art.

The work is a tribute to Louise Élisabeth Vigée Le Brun.

References

External links 
 http://www.the-athenaeum.org/art/detail.php?ID=124109
 http://womenintheactofpainting.blogspot.com/2012/11/
 http://books0977.tumblr.com/post/33638549693/the-interior-of-an-atelier-of-a-woman-painter

1789 paintings
Metropolitan Museum of Art 2017 drafts
Paintings in the collection of the Metropolitan Museum of Art
Portraits of women
Paintings about painting